Richard Philip Judd (born 18 May 1992) is a New Zealand rugby union player who plays for the  in the Super Rugby competition. He also plays for the San Diego Legion of Major League Rugby in the U.S. His position of choice is scrum-half.

References 

New Zealand rugby union players
1992 births
Living people
Rugby union scrum-halves
Counties Manukau rugby union players
Bay of Plenty rugby union players
Hurricanes (rugby union) players
Tokyo Sungoliath players
Wellington rugby union players
Rugby union players from Waikato
San Diego Legion players